Order in Decline is the seventh studio album by Canadian rock band Sum 41. It was released on July 19, 2019, by Hopeless Records. The band released the lead single "Out for Blood" on April 24, 2019. The second single from the album, "A Death in the Family" was released on June 11, 2019. The band released the third single "Never There" on June 18, 2019. The fourth single "45 (A Matter of Time)" was released on July 8, 2019.

Background
On April 23, 2019, the band announced via social media that they were working on their seventh studio album. According to lead singer Deryck Whibley, the album will feature lyrics regarding social and political turmoil over the US and Canada. Whibley stated “The last thing I wanted to do was write a social or political protest record, and Order In Decline is not that. It's also very hard not to have feelings about everything that's going on in the world.” The band released a press statement calling the album their "heaviest and most aggressive" to date.

Whibley produced, engineered, and mixed the album himself.
During the three years touring for 13 Voices, the band came up with several song ideas. After finishing the tour; the music was finished within three weeks, with lyrics finished shortly afterwards.

Singles
On April 24, 2019, they released the single "Out for Blood", written by Deryck Whibley and Mike Green through Hopeless Records, along with an accompanying music video. The same day, the band also announced their seventh studio album, Order In Decline, which was released on July 19, 2019. On June 11, the second single "A Death in the Family" was released along with a music video. On June 18, "Never There" was released as the third single, along with a video. On July 8, a fourth single, “45 (A Matter of Time),” was released, along with a music video. The acoustic versions of “Heads Will Roll” and “Catching Fire,” which were released as bonus tracks, were released as a digital single under the title “Order In Decline B-Sides.”

On May 28, 2021, almost two years after the album’s initial release, the band released a version of "Catching Fire" featuring Nothing,Nowhere, accompanied by a music video.

Composition
Musically, Order in Decline has been described as continuing the band's departure from pop punk, instead showing styles such as heavy metal, punk rock, hard rock, melodic hardcore, and alternative metal.

Critical reception 

At Metacritic, which assigns a normalized rating out of 100 to reviews from mainstream critics, the album has an average score of 75 out of 100 based on 6 reviews, indicating "generally favorable reviews". AllMusic called the album "one of the most accomplished albums in their catalog." Wall of Sound gave the album a positive review, stating: "While it’s doubtful we’ll be seeing any pop/punk revival from these guys, Order in Decline is the best version of Sum 41 we've heard in years."

Kerrang! was positive toward the album, calling it "a darkly personal view of the world [and] their heaviest album to date." Slant Magazine was positive towards the album's production, calling it "pitch-perfect."

Distorted Sound Magazine was positive towards the album, stating: "Although ... some of the songs do not quite hit the mark, Order In Decline is a fine new effort from Sum 41 ... nostalgia can be a double-edged sword, but here, Sum 41 show no signs of relying on their successes of years gone by."

Accolades

Track listing
All tracks written by Deryck Whibley, except where noted.

Personnel
Sum 41
 Deryck Whibley – vocals, guitars, keyboards, piano, production, engineering, mixing
 Dave Baksh – guitars, backing vocals
 Tom Thacker – guitars, keyboards, backing vocals
 Jason McCaslin – bass guitar, backing vocals
 Frank Zummo – drums, percussion, occasional backing vocals

Additional personnel

 Mike Green – guitar, keyboards
 Ted Jensen – mastering
 Doug McKean – drum engineering
 Chaz Sexton – engineering assistance
 Brian Manley – artwork, layout
 Josh Budich – cover art
 Ashley Osborn – band photo
 Fredric Johansson – photography
 Kirsten Otto – photography
 Ryan Watanabe – photography
 Tyler Ross – photography

Charts

References

Sum 41 albums
2019 albums
Hopeless Records albums